James Ehleringer is an American biologist and Distinguished Professor of at the University of Utah. He is an elected member of the US National Academy of Sciences, a Fellow of the American Geophysical Union, Ecological Society of America, and American Association for Advancement of Science. He is an ISI Highly Cited researcher. Together with Thure E. Cerling, he established the Stable Isotope Biogeochemistry and Ecology (IsoCamp) summer course at the University of Utah, which "trains students in the fundamental environmental and biological theory underlying isotope fractionation processes across a broad spectrum of ecological and environmental applications".

References

Living people
University of Utah faculty
Members of the United States National Academy of Sciences
Fellows of the American Geophysical Union
Fellows of the American Association for the Advancement of Science
San Diego State University alumni
Stanford University alumni
Fellows of the Ecological Society of America
Year of birth missing (living people)